Marvin John Heemeyer (October 28, 1951 – June 4, 2004) was an American automobile muffler repair shop owner who, following a dispute with  town officials, demolished numerous buildings with a modified bulldozer in Granby, Colorado, on June 4, 2004.

Heemeyer had feuded with Granby town officials, particularly over fines for violating city health ordinances after he purchased property with no sewage system. Over about eighteen months, Heemeyer had secretly modified a Komatsu D355A bulldozer by adding layers of steel and concrete, intended to serve as armor. 

On June 4, 2004, Heemeyer's feud with Granby culminated in a spree in which he used the armored bulldozer to demolish the Granby town hall, the former mayor's house, and several other buildings. Heemeyer's rampage concluded with his suicide, after his bulldozer became trapped in the basement of a hardware store he had been in the process of destroying.

Background
According to a neighbor, Heemeyer moved to town more than ten years before the incident. His friends stated that he had no relatives in the Granby–Grand Lake area.

John Bauldree, a friend of Heemeyer's, said that he was a likable person. Heemeyer's brother Ken stated that he "would bend over backwards for anyone". However, while many people described Heemeyer as an affable person, local resident Christie Baker claimed that her husband was threatened by Heemeyer after refusing to pay for a disputed muffler repair. Baker said her husband later paid Heemeyer $124.

Zoning dispute
In 1992, Heemeyer purchased  of land from the Resolution Trust Corporation, the federal agency organized to handle the assets of failed savings and loan associations, for $42,000 to build a muffler shop. He subsequently agreed to sell the land to Cody Docheff to build a concrete batch plant, Mountain Park Concrete, for $250,000. According to Susan Docheff, Heemeyer changed his mind and increased the price to $375,000, then to a deal worth approximately $1 million. This negotiation happened before the rezoning proposal was heard by the town council.

In 2001, Granby's zoning commission and trustees approved the construction of the concrete plant. Heemeyer unsuccessfully appealed the decision, claiming the construction blocked access to his shop. He was subsequently fined $2,500 for not having a septic tank on the property his muffler shop occupied.

The bulldozer

Heemeyer's bulldozer was a modified Komatsu D355A, which he referred to as the "MK Tank" in audio recordings, fitted with makeshift armor plating covering the cabin, engine, and parts of the tracks. This made the machine impervious to small arms fire and resistant to explosives. Three external explosions and more than 200 rounds of ammunition fired at the bulldozer had no effect on it.

For visibility, the bulldozer was fitted with several video cameras linked to two monitors mounted on the vehicle's dashboard. The cameras were protected on the outside by  shields of clear bulletproof lexan. Compressed-air nozzles were fitted to blow dust away from the video cameras. 

Onboard fans and an air conditioner were used to keep Heemeyer cool while driving. He had made three gun-ports, fitted for a .50 caliber rifle, a .308 caliber semi-automatic rifle, and a .22 caliber rifle, all fitted with a  steel plate.  

Authorities initially speculated that he may have used a homemade cranefound in his garageto lower the armor hull over the dozer and himself. Heemeyer apparently had no intention of leaving the cabin once he entered it. "Once he tipped that lid shut, he knew he wasn't getting out", Daly said. Investigators searched the garage where they believed that Heemeyer built the vehicle and found cement and armor steel.

"It is interesting to observe that I was never caught", Heemeyer wrote. "This was a part-time project over a  year time period." He was surprised that several men, who had visited the shed late the previous year, had not noticed the modified bulldozer "especially with the  lift fully exposed ... somehow their vision was clouded".

Demolition
On June 4, 2004, Heemeyer drove his armored bulldozer through the wall of his former business, the concrete plant, the town hall, the office of the local newspaper that editorialized against him, the home of a former mayor (in which the mayor's widow then resided), and a hardware store owned by another man Heemeyer named in a lawsuit, as well as a few others. Heemeyer had leased his business to a trash company and sold the property several months before the rampage.

The attack lasted two hours and seven minutes, damaging thirteen buildings. It knocked out natural gas service to the town hall and the concrete plant, damaged a truck, and destroyed part of a utility service center. Despite the great damage to property, no one besides Heemeyer (by a self-inflicted gunshot wound) was killed in the event. The damage was estimated at $7 million. According to Grand County commissioner James Newberry, emergency dispatchers used the reverse 911 emergency system to notify many residents and property owners of the rampage going on in the town.

Defenders of Heemeyer contended that he made a point of not hurting anybody during his bulldozer rampage. Ian Daugherty, a bakery owner, said Heemeyer "went out of his way" not to harm anyone. Others offered different views. The sheriff's department argued the fact that no one was injured was not due to good intent as much as to good luck. Heemeyer had installed two rifles in firing ports on the inside of the bulldozer, and fired fifteen bullets from his rifle at power transformers and propane tanks.

"Had these tanks ruptured and exploded, anyone within one-half mile (800 m) of the explosion could have been endangered", the sheriff's department said. Twelve police officers and residents of a senior citizens complex were within such a range. Heemeyer fired many bullets from his semi-automatic rifle at Cody Docheff when Docheff tried to stop the assault on his concrete plant by using a scraper, which was pushed aside by Heemeyer's bulldozer.

Later, Heemeyer fired on two state patrol officers before they had fired at him. The sheriff's department also noted that eleven of the thirteen buildings Heemeyer bulldozed were occupied until moments before their destruction. At the town library, for example, a children's program was in progress when the incident began.

One officer dropped a flash-bang grenade down the bulldozer's exhaust pipe, with no apparent effect. Local and state patrol, including a SWAT team, walked behind and beside the bulldozer, occasionally firing, but the armored bulldozer was impervious to their shots. Attempts to disable the bulldozer's cameras with gunfire failed as the bullets were unable to penetrate the 3-inch (7.6 cm) bulletproof plastic. At one point, undersheriff Glenn Trainor climbed atop the bulldozer and rode it "like a bronc buster, trying to figure out a way to get a bullet inside the dragon". However, he was forced to jump off to avoid being hit with debris.

At this point, local authorities and the Colorado State Patrol feared they were running out of options in terms of firepower, and that Heemeyer would soon turn against civilians in Granby. Governor Bill Owens allegedly considered authorizing the National Guard to use either an Apache attack helicopter equipped with a Hellfire missile or a two-man fire team equipped with a Javelin anti-tank missile to destroy the bulldozer. This was quickly deemed unnecessary when Heemeyer became trapped in the basement of a Gambles hardware store.

As late as 2011, Governor Owens's staff still vehemently denied considering such a course of action. Since then, members of the State Patrol revealed that to the contrary, the governor did consider authorizing an attack but ultimately decided against it due to the potential for collateral damage of a missile strike in the heart of Granby being significantly higher than what Heemeyer could have caused with his bulldozer.

Various problems arose as Heemeyer destroyed the Gambles hardware store. The radiator of the bulldozer had been damaged, and the engine was leaking various fluids. The bulldozer's engine failed, and Heemeyer dropped a tread into the store's basement and could not get out. About a minute later, one of the SWAT team members, who had swarmed around the machine, reported hearing a single gunshot from inside the sealed cab. It was later determined that Heemeyer had shot himself in the head with a .357-caliber handgun.

Police first used explosives in an attempt to remove the steel plates, but after the third explosion failed, they cut through them with an oxyacetylene cutting torch. Grand County Emergency Management Director Jim Holahan stated that authorities were able to access and remove Heemeyer's body at 2 a.m. on June 5.

Aftermath 
On April 19, 2005, the town announced plans to scrap Heemeyer's bulldozer. The plan involved dispersing individual pieces to many separate scrap yards to prevent souvenir-taking.

Although no one other than Heemeyer was killed in the incident, the modified bulldozer has occasionally been referred to as the "Killdozer". It is unclear whether this is in allusion to the 1944 short story "Killdozer!" or its 1974 film adaptation, or if this is independent coinage.

Motivation
In addition to writings that he left on the wall of his shed, Heemeyer recorded three audio tapes explaining his motivation for the attack. The tapes contained two separate recordings on each side for a total of six recordings. He mailed these to his brother in South Dakota shortly before stepping into his bulldozer.

Heemeyer's brother turned the tapes over to the Federal Bureau of Investigation (FBI), who in turn sent them to the Grand County Sheriff's Department. The tapes were released by the Grand County Sheriff's Office on August 31, 2004. The tapes are about 2.5 hours in length. The first recording was made on April 13, 2004. The last recording was made on May 22, thirteen days before the rampage.

"God built me for this job", Heemeyer said in the first recording. He also said it was God's plan that he not be married or have a family so that he could be in a position to carry out such an attack. "I think God will bless me to get the machine done, to drive it, to do the stuff that I have to do", he said. "God blessed me in advance for the task that I am about to undertake. It is my duty. God has asked me to do this. It's a cross that I am going to carry and I'm carrying it in God's name."

Investigators later found Heemeyer's handwritten list of targets. According to the police, it included the buildings he destroyed, the local Catholic church (which he did not damage), and the names of various people who had sided against him in past disputes. Notes found by investigators after the incident indicated that the primary motivation for the bulldozer rampage was his plan to stop the concrete plant from being built near his shop. These notes indicated that he held grudges over the zoning approval. "I was always willing to be reasonable until I had to be unreasonable", he wrote. "Sometimes reasonable men must do unreasonable things."

In popular culture
 Leviathan (2014 film) – a Russian film inspired by Heemeyer's story 
 Tread (film) – a 2019 documentary film based on the rampage

See also
 Shawn Nelson – perpetrator of a similar armored vehicle rampage in San Diego, California.

References

Further reading

External links
 Discovery Channel – Destroyed in Seconds video
 Washington Post Article
 Denver Channel Article
 CBS4: Bulldozer Rampage Revisited* 
 
 Granby Damage, includes several pictures of the incident
 
 Audio: Hear from Marvin Heemeyer himself in recorded 'manifesto' Sky-Hi News. December 1, 2017.
The Heemeyer Tapes at Internet Archive

1951 births
2004 deaths
Welders
Suicides by firearm in Colorado
American male criminals
2004 crimes in the United States
People from Grand County, Colorado
Marvin Heemeyer
Attacks in the United States in 2004
Vehicular rampage in the United States
2004 suicides
Grand Lake, Colorado